"Jezebel" is a song recorded by New Zealand singer-songwriter, Jon Stevens. The song was produced by Steve Robinson. It was released in October 1979 as Stevens' debut single and peaked at number 1 in New Zealand on 2 December 1979 and remained at number 1 for 9 weeks.

Track listing
 Vinyl, 7", 45 RPM
 "Jezebel" - 3:28
 "Rest Your Love on Me”" - 3:25

Charts

Year-end charts

See also
 List of number-one singles in 1979 (New Zealand)
 List of number-one singles from the 1980s (New Zealand)

References

1979 debut singles
1979 songs
Number-one singles in New Zealand
Jon Stevens songs
CBS Records singles